Hokum is a type of song in American blues music.

Hokum may refer to:
A euphemism for nonsense
The NATO code name for the Kamov Ka-50, a Russian attack helicopter
The Bell-Bristol Aerospace Hokum-X, a U.S. Army target drone